The Flint was an automobile marque that was assembled by the Flint Motors Division, Flint, Michigan between 1923 and 1927.  Flint Motors was a wholly owned subsidiary of Durant Motors Company (United States).

Assembly
The Flint was considered an assembled car because Durant Motors used components manufactured by outside suppliers to build its automobile lines. The cars were powered by a 6-cylinder Continental engine, and its body stampings were made by Budd in Philadelphia.

Design origin
The origins of the Flint can be traced back to the Willys car company, which under the direction of Walter P. Chrysler had been working on a prototype for a proposed 6-cylinder car. Willys had to sell off this prototype as part of its efforts to raise cash during a financial crisis. Once acquired, this prototype was further modified to create the Flint.

Company demise
Following financial troubles at Durant Motors, the Flint was discontinued in 1927. The Flint was priced to compete with Buick, which was also assembled in Flint, Michigan.

Production model specifications
 Flint Six "55" Four Door Brougham

Flint Automobile Company
Automobiles produced by Flint should not be confused with those manufactured by the Flint Automobile Company, founded by A. B. C. Hardy in 1901, and which went out of business in 1903 after manufacturing only 52 automobiles in the $750–$850 price range.

See also
 Durant Motors

References

External links
 Flint (1901 - 03) history
 Flint (1901 - 03)
 Sloan Museum traces Flint's rich automotive history

Defunct motor vehicle manufacturers of the United States
Durant Motors
Motor vehicle manufacturers based in Michigan
Defunct manufacturing companies based in Michigan